Heritage Microfilm, Inc. (est. 1997) is a preservation microfilm and microfilm digitization business located in Cedar Rapids, Iowa.

History
The company began in 1996 when the microfilm division of Cedar Rapids-based Crest Information Technologies was sold to Christopher Gill. The microfilm division was responsible at the time for preserving newspapers and for microfilming business documents.  The business document filming portion of the business was soon dropped in favor of the newspaper microfilming division. Crest in 1999 sold the remaining portion of the company to Lason.

In 1999, Heritage Microfilm began digitizing newspaper microfilm and launched NewspaperArchive.  Soon after, it began creating smaller "branded" newspaper archive websites in collaboration with publishing partners.

The firm works with ANSI/AIIM standards for preservation microfilming. It has a humidity and temperature-controlled storage facility.  It is a Kodak ImageGuard facility. One of its specializations is damaged microfilm recovery.  It has an Extek 3441 microfilm duplicator, which duplicates at low speeds to prevent damage to Redox or Vinegar-Syndrome microfilm. It uses Kodak silver halide microfilm for master film and primary duplications.  It discontinued the use of vesicular film for duplications, due to the poor quality film available from distributors.  It claims to use Kodak BrownToner, a polysulfide film treatment, on every reel of silver-halide microfilm that they produce.

NewspaperArchive

NewspaperArchive is a commercial online database of digitized newspapers, and claims to be the world's largest newspaper archive. The site was launched in 1999 by Heritage Microfilm.

, NewspaperArchive said it provided full-text search for 909 million articles on 85 million pages over 240 years that represented 2,875 publication titles in more than 748 cities. As of 2015, the product includes newspapers from Azerbaijan, Canada, China, Denmark, France, Germany, Ireland, Jamaica, Japan, Kazakhstan, Kyrgyzstan, South Africa, Tajikistan, Turkmenistan, the United Kingdom, the United States, the U.S. Virgin Islands, and Uzbekistan.

Searches can be conducted by keyword, date, and location. Results are free, but access to the newspaper articles available to download in PDF format requires a subscription. The company says that it follows the Automated Content Access Protocol in which its clients have a say in what is available online. The digitized newspapers that are currently available and OCR'd represent a fraction of the 150 million pages of historical documents that Heritage Microfilm maintains in its microform archive. According to NewspaperArchive, it has 180,000 reels of microfilm.

A reviewer in 2004 observed that at the time the archive had some errors with year dates, and in June 2014, The Iowa Attorney General’s Office opened an investigation after complaints about deceptive and misleading practices that include charging subscribers for involuntary donations to a charity.

NewspaperArchive claims as of 30 June 2018 that it has online newspapers dating from 1607 worldwide and its index includes 9,829 newspapers.

Criticism
In a 2005 Association of College and Research Libraries paper, Bernard F. Reilly, Jr. expressed concern about the extent of Heritage Microfilm's involvement with stewardship of historical resources otherwise assumed to be held in the public trust. Reilly wrote, "until 2002, the Library of Congress and the Center for Research Libraries regularly microfilmed the principal daily newspaper of Jamaica, The Gleaner. In 2002 the Gleaner Publishing Company executed an agreement with Heritage Microfilm, Inc. giving to the for-profit firm exclusive rights to reformat and distribute The Gleaner, in both microform and digital format. Because Heritage now holds exclusive digital rights the agreement effectively shifts control of back files to the commercial sector, where it is marketed primarily for genealogists and family history researchers."

See also
 Microdot
 Microphotograph
 Microprinting
 Newspapers.com

References

Online archives of the United States
Companies based in Cedar Rapids, Iowa
Companies established in 1997
Information technology companies of the United States
Photography companies of the United States
Digital preservation
Mass digitization
1997 establishments in Iowa
Newspaper companies of the United States
Information technology companies